Maan Rahe Tera Pitaah is an Indian television drama series which premiered on Sony Entertainment Television on 1 June 2010. The story is of a girl named Anmol who fights the society for the respect and honor of her father.

Cast
Archana Taide ... Anmol
Gautam Rode... Rajveer
 Nandini Master ... Anmol (Child Artist)
Pramod Moutho ... Anmol's dad
Varun Badola ... Kaliprasad (Anmol's uncle who is a MLA)
Kshitee Jog ... Kaliprasad's wife
Krip Suri ... Madhav (Kaliprasad's older son)
Reshmi Ghosh ... Madhav's wife
Bharat Kaul ... Chief Engineer of the coal mine in Brahampur
Sulbha Arya ... Dadi (Anmol's grandmother)

References

Sony Entertainment Television original programming
Indian television series
Indian television soap operas
Indian drama television series
2010 Indian television series debuts
2010 Indian television series endings
Swastik Productions television series